Erwinia pyrifoliae is a Gram-negative bacterium and a phytopathogen of Asian pear trees (Pyrus pyrifolia), causing necrotic disease. Its type strain is Ep16/96T(=CFBP 4172T =DSM 12163T.

References

Further reading 
 Kim, Won Sik, et al. "Molecular detection and differentiation of Erwinia pyrifoliae and host range analysis of the Asian pear pathogen." Plant disease 85.11 (2001): 1183–1188.

External links 
LPSN
Type strain of Erwinia pyrifoliae at BacDive -  the Bacterial Diversity Metadatabase

Bacterial tree pathogens and diseases
Pear tree diseases
Bacteria described in 1999
Enterobacterales